The Remix War is a remix album by Pitchshifter, released in November 1994 by Earache. The EP is composed of remixes of select songs from Pitchshifter's prior release, Desensitized. The bands who worked on the remixes were Therapy?, Gunshot, and Biohazard.

Track listing

Japanese edition bonus tracks

Personnel

Pitchshifter
 J.S. Clayden – vocals, production (1, 3, 5, 7)
 J.A. Carter – guitar, programming, production (1, 3, 5, 7)
 M.D. Clayden – bass, production (1, 3, 5, 7)
 'D'.J. Walters – percussion, production (1, 3, 5, 7)

Technical personnel
 Jase Cooper – pre-production assistant (1, 3, 5, 7)
 Ric Peet – engineering (1, 3, 5, 7)
 Tim Boland – engineering (2)
 Lorcan Cousins – assistant engineering (2)
 No Sleep Nigel – engineering (4)
 White Child Rix – production (4)
 John Travis – engineering (6)
 A. Salas – assistant engineering (6)
 Billy Graziadei – production (6)
 Omni-Design – cover design

References

Pitchshifter albums
1995 remix albums
Earache Records remix albums